The Best Of Disney Volume 2 is a compilation album of musical highlights from Disney film favorites.

Track listing
"When You Wish Upon a Star" (Pinocchio) – Cliff Edwards
"A Spoonful of Sugar" (Mary Poppins) – Julie Andrews
"Little April Shower" (Bambi) – Disney Studio Chorus
"Oo-De-Lally" (Robin Hood) – Roger Miller
"Someone's Waiting for You" (The Rescuers) – Shelby Flint
"Disco Mouse (Mickey Mouse March)" (The New Mickey Mouse Club) – The Mouseketeers
"Supercalifragilisticexpialidocious" (Mary Poppins) – Julie Andrews & Dick Van Dyke
"Lavender Blue (Dilly Dilly)" (So Dear to My Heart) – Burl Ives
"The Wonderful Thing About Tiggers" (Winnie the Pooh and the Blustery Day) – Sam Edwards
"I've Got No Strings" (Pinocchio) – Dickie Jones
"You Can Fly! You Can Fly! You Can Fly!" (Peter Pan) – The Jud Conlon Chorus & The Mellomen
"It's Not Easy" (Pete's Dragon) – Helen Reddy & Sean Marshall

1978 compilation albums
Disneyland Records compilation albums
Children's music albums